Jackson Rose (1886–1956) was an American cinematographer. He shot more than a hundred and fifty short and feature films during his career. He began his career at the Chicago-based Essanay Pictures, then worked for Universal Pictures for much of the 1920s. He also shot films for a variety other studios including Tiffany Pictures, MGM, Columbia Pictures and Warner Brothers

Selected filmography

 The Slim Princess (1915)
 The Prince of Graustark (1916)
 Captain Jinks of the Horse Marines (1916)
 Skinner's Dress Suit (1917)
 The Trufflers (1917)
 The Mutiny of the Elsinore (1920)
 Burning Daylight (1920)
 Big Game (1921)
 The Marriage of William Ashe (1921)
 Paid Back (1922)
 The Married Flapper (1922)
 His Last Race (1923)
 The Dangerous Age (1923)
 The Night Message (1924)
 The Whispered Name (1924)
 Excitement (1924)
 The Sunset Trail (1924)
 Young Ideas (1924)
 The Dangerous Blonde (1924)
 Big Timber (1924)
 The Measure of a Man (1924)
 Smouldering Fires (1925)
 Ridin' Pretty (1925)
 The Storm Breaker (1925)
 Straight Through (1925)
 Up the Ladder (1925)
 The Mystery Club (1926)
 The Old Soak (1926)
 The Midnight Sun (1926)
 The Beautiful Cheat (1926)
 Alias the Deacon (1927)
 Held by the Law (1927)
 Cheating Cheaters (1927)
 Lingerie (1928)
 Love Me and the World Is Mine (1928)
 We Americans (1928)
 The Foreign Legion (1928)
 The Grip of the Yukon (1928)
 Green Grass Widows (1928)
 Midstream (1929)
 Girl on the Barge (1929)
 Painted Faces (1929)
 The College Coquette (1929)
 The Lost Zeppelin (1929)
 The Girl from Woolworth's (1929)
 Troopers Three (1930)
 A Lady Surrenders (1930)
 The Swellhead (1930)
 Once a Gentleman (1930)
 Seed (1931)
 Strictly Dishonorable (1931)
 Reckless Living (1931)
 Texas Gun Fighter (1932)
 Law and Order (1932)
 Radio Patrol (1932)
 Don't Bet on Love (1933)
 Phantom Thunderbolt (1933)
 The Three Wise Guys (1936)
 Mama Steps Out (1937)
 Northwest Rangers (1942)
 The Unknown Guest (1943)
 Trocadero (1944)
 Dillinger (1945)
 Main Street After Dark (1945)
 Fear (1946)
 Stepchild (1947)
 Born to Speed (1947)
 Out of the Blue (1947)
 Philo Vance's Secret Mission (1947)
 Philo Vance's Gamble (1947)
 Philo Vance Returns  (1947)
 The Checkered Coat (1948)
 Bungalow 13 (1948)
 I Cheated the Law (1949)
 Destination Murder (1950)
 The Great Plane Robbery (1950)
 Experiment Alcatraz (1950)

References

Bibliography
 Bruce Babington & Charles Barr. The Call of the Heart: John M. Stahl and Hollywood Melodrama. Indiana University Press, 2018.

External links

1886 births
1956 deaths
American cinematographers
People from Chicago